CIMO-FM is a French-language radio station located in Magog, Quebec, Canada, near Sherbrooke.

Owned and operated by Bell Media, it broadcasts on 106.1 MHz with an effective radiated power of 1,600 watts (class B) using an omnidirectional antenna located on the top of Mount Orford. Because of severe coverage deficiencies in downtown Sherbrooke, the station also operates a low-power relay there, CIMO-FM-1, which broadcasts on 106.9 MHz with an effective radiated power of 22 watts, also using an omnidirectional antenna.

The station has a mainstream rock format and is part of the "Énergie" network which operates across Quebec. It started operations on September 9, 1979. CIMO became a sister station to the now-defunct CJRS (even though that station was located in Sherbrooke) in 1987, as it was bought by Radiomutuel (predecessor of Astral Media).

Notes

External links
 Énergie 106.1
 

Imo
Imo
Magog, Quebec
Imo
Imo
Radio stations established in 1979
1979 establishments in Quebec